John Eager may refer to:

John Eager (1782–1853?), English organist
John Eager, drummer on The London Boys

See also
Johnny Eager, film
John Eager Howard